Yury Zakharov (born 2 August 1933) is a Soviet long-distance runner. He competed in the men's 5000 metres at the 1960 Summer Olympics.

References

1933 births
Living people
Athletes (track and field) at the 1960 Summer Olympics
Soviet male long-distance runners
Olympic athletes of the Soviet Union
Place of birth missing (living people)